Ekaterina Makygina (born 30 November 1993) is a Russian rhythmic gymnast.

Career 
Since 2001 she was a pupil of SDYUSSHOR 1 in Perm, coached by Marina Munipova. In  years she became the leader of the Perm Region in her age category.

Junior 
Since July 2006, she trained at the Olympic Reserve school in Dmitrov, Moscow Oblast. Since 2007, she has performed in individual exercises under the guidance of Anna Shumilova  and was part of Russia's junior team.

In 2007 she won gold at championship of the Moscow region and the Central Federal District. Malygina was the bronze medalist in the ribbon final at the Russian Championship. She won All-Around bronze at the III Student Games as part of the team of the Central Federal District and at the "Hopes of Russia" tournament. Ekaterina also won medals in International competitions in Kyiv and Ljubljana.

Malygina retained her title of champion of the Central Federal District in 2008. She then won gold the Russian Championship, silver in the All-Around and the ball final, bronze in the rope final and in the team competition. She competed in international competitions and won medals in Germany, Romania, Israel, Italy. In the summer she was awarded the title of Master of Sports of International Class. In September 2008, after the team that competed at the Olympic Games in Beijing, Malygina was included in the Russian group.

Senior 
As a member of the group Ekaterina won medals in World Cups and Grand Prixes. She then won All-Around and 3 ribbons + 2 ropes bronze at World Champion in Mie, Japan, becoming world champion in the 5 hoops final. For this Malygina was awarded the title of Honored Master of Sports of Russia.

In 2010, Ekaterina kept winning prizes at World Cup and Grand Prix's stage. At the European Championships in Bremen, Germany, the Russian group won gold in all the events. In September Malygina participated in the World Championships in Moscow, Russia, becoming bronze All-Around medallist and World Champion in both the 5 hoops and 3 ribbons + 2 balls finals.

At the end of 2010, Ekaterina Malygina decided to retire from the sport.  She is now a coach at her own club.

References 

1993 births
Living people
Russian rhythmic gymnasts
21st-century Russian women